Elections were held on 25 November 1967 to elect half of the 60 seats in the Australian Senate. There was no accompanying election to the House of Representatives as the two election cycles had been out of synchronisation since 1963. The results were a setback for the government of Harold Holt. Having won a landslide victory at the House-only election the previous year, the Coalition instead lost two seats in the Senate. The Labor Party failed to make any gains in Gough Whitlam's first election as leader; the Democratic Labor Party gained two seats and held the balance of power until 1974.

Notes
In New South Wales, Queensland, and Victoria, the coalition parties ran a joint ticket. Of the six senators elected on a joint ticket, three were members of the Liberal Party and three were members of the Country Party. In Western Australia, the coalition parties ran on separate tickets. In South Australia and Tasmania, only the Liberal Party ran a ticket.
The sole independent elected was Reg Turnbull of Tasmania.

See also
 Candidates of the Australian Senate election, 1967
 Members of the Australian Senate, 1968–1971

References

University of WA  election results in Australia since 1890

Australian Senate elections
1967 elections in Australia
November 1967 events in Australia